Steffen Kjærgaard (born 24 May 1973) is a Norwegian former professional cyclist. Kjærgaard cycled for US Postal Service (2000–2003). He competed in the individual pursuit at the 1992 Summer Olympics. He twice participated in the Tour de France, taking 89th place in 2000 and 101st place in 2001; in both years team captain Lance Armstrong initially won overall but was later disqualified due to doping. Known as a strong time-trial cyclist, Kjærgaard won the overall World Cup in track cycling in 1993. He won the Norwegian National Road Race Championship in 1994.

Kjærgaard has won 12 Nordic Championship (Nordiska mesterskap) gold medals and three King's Cups (kongepokaler). He was director of sport for the Norwegian Cycling Federation until he had to resign in 2012 due to admitting the use of performance-enhancing drugs in his active career. Kjærgaard is married and has two children.

Doping
After the doping allegations against Lance Armstrong, Kjærsgaard admitted use of performance-enhancing drugs on 23 October 2012.

Teams
 US Postal Service Pro Cycling Team
 Team Chicky World
 TVM (cycling team)
 Glåmdal-Nittedal Elite Oslo
 Hasle-Løren IL
 Tønsberg Cycling Club

Major results
 Circuit de la Sarthe (1999)
 Bayern-Rundfahrt (1998)
 Tour de Normandie (1999)
 Tour of Austria (1995)
 Ringerike Grand Prix (1994)

References

External links

1973 births
Living people
Sportspeople from Tønsberg
Norwegian male cyclists
Norwegian sportspeople in doping cases
Doping cases in cycling
Olympic cyclists of Norway
Cyclists at the 1992 Summer Olympics